Evelita Juanita Spinelli (October 17, 1889 - November 21, 1941) nicknamed The Duchess, was the first woman to be executed by the state of California. She was a gangster and ex-wrestler.

Criminal history
FBI profiler Candice DeLong described Spinelli as a "stone cold psychopath who had no use for anybody, other than what she could get out of them."(Deadly Women, season 4, episode 2). Young delinquent homeless men were regularly taken into her house in San Francisco. She would cook and clean for them and train them to be professional criminals. The men received a ten-dollar weekly allowance, with Spinelli receiving the lion's share of their ill-gotten gains. Her daughter Lorraine, known as "Gypsy," regularly used a honey trap to snare drunken men, who were consequently mugged.

Two of Spinelli's protégés, Albert Ives and Robert Sherrod, killed Leland Cash during a robbery in San Francisco (when he reached into his pocket to turn up his hearing aid, Ives assumed he was reaching for a gun and shot Cash in the stomach). Fearing Sherrod would confess to the police, Spinelli gave him whiskey that she had laced with chloral hydrate. The gang then beat him up whilst he was unconscious. To make his death appear accidental, they threw him off the Clarksburg bridge on the Sacramento River, just south of Sacramento, wearing only swimming trunks. However, the autopsy showed there was no water in his lungs. Fearing for his own survival, Ives escaped and confessed to the police and was committed to Mendocino State Hospital for life. Spinelli was consequently arrested. Her gang members testified against her at her trial.

She was described by Clinton Duffy, the warden at San Quentin State Prison, as "the coldest, hardest character, male or female, I have ever known, a homely, scrawny, nearsighted, sharp-featured scarecrow. . . . The Duchess was a hag, evil as a witch, horrible to look at, impossible to like."

Execution
Spinelli was executed on November 21, 1941, at the age of 52, in the gas chamber at San Quentin.

In popular culture
Her story was dramatized on TV in the Gang Busters episode,"The Duchess Spinelli Case".

References 

1889 births
1941 deaths
20th-century executions by California
20th-century executions of American people
American people executed for murder
American female murderers
Executed American women
People convicted of murder by California
People executed by California by gas chamber